Antonio Janni (19 September 1904 – 29 June 1987) was an Italian football manager and former player who played as a midfielder.

Career
Throughout his career, Janni played for Italian sides Torino and Varese at club level. Janni was a member of the Italy national team which won the bronze medal in the 1928 Summer Olympic football tournament. & gold medal at the 1927–30 Central European International Cup.

Honours

Player

Club
 Torino
 Italian Football Championship/Serie A: 1927–28
 Coppa Italia: 1935–36

International
Italy
 Central European International Cup: 1927–30
 Summer Olympics: Bronze 1928

Manager

Club
 Torino
 Serie A: 1942–43
 Coppa Italia: 1942–43

 SPAL
 Serie B: 1950–51

 Varese
 Serie C: 1938–39, 1941–42

References

External links
 
 Profile at Enciclopediadelcalcio.it
 
 
 

1904 births
1987 deaths
Italian footballers
Footballers at the 1924 Summer Olympics
Footballers at the 1928 Summer Olympics
Olympic footballers of Italy
Olympic bronze medalists for Italy
Italy international footballers
Olympic medalists in football
Torino F.C. players
S.S.D. Varese Calcio players
Medalists at the 1928 Summer Olympics
Association football midfielders
People from Santena
Footballers from Piedmont
Sportspeople from the Metropolitan City of Turin